Walter Hermanus Jacobus Steins SJ (1 July 1810 – 7 September 1881) was a Dutch Jesuit priest, Vicar Apostolic of Bombay, India (1860–1867), Vicar Apostolic of West Bengal (1867–1877) and (under the personal title of "Archbishop"), third Catholic Bishop of Auckland (1879–1881).

Early life
Walter Steins was born in 1810 in Amsterdam, Netherlands. He was educated there, at St Acheul, Amiens and at Fribourg, Switzerland. In 1832 he entered the Belgian province of the Society of Jesus, was ordained a priest on 8 September 1842 (in Louvain), and made his final profession as a Jesuit in 1849.

Vicar Apostolic in India
Steins obtained permission from his superiors to proceed to Borneo (at that time part of a Dutch colony) but went instead to Bombay where he exercised his priestly ministry until 29 June 1861 when he was consecrated a Bishop and assumed the office of Vicar Apostolic. He founded the college of St Francis-Xavier In 1867 he was translated to become Vicar Apostolic of West Bengal, based in Calcutta. He brought to Bengal the French religious order of the Daughters of the Cross, founded the St Vincent's home refuge and many schools and orphanages. He began also the Bengali mission and missions to the Santals and other eastern tribes. Because of ill-health caused by a fall he was advised to return to Europe and he spent time recuperating at Conflans-sur-Seine, the novitiate of the Sisters of the Sacred Heart in Paris.

Bishop of Auckland
Steins recovered sufficiently to request a further appointment and on 16 May 1879 he was appointed as Bishop of Auckland. He arrived on 3 December 1879 and was 15 months in the country. He died on 7 September 1881 in Sydney, as he was, once again, returning to Europe. Archbishop Steins " ... was a distinguished theologian and linguist; broadminded and tolerant". He attended the First Vatican Council in 1870.

Honorific eponyms

Steins Avenue in Hillsborough, Auckland was named after Bisschop in the early 1980s.

Notes

References/Sources

 E.R. Simmons, A Brief History of the Catholic Church in New Zealand, Catholic Publication Centre, Auckland, 1978.
 E.R. Simmons, In Cruce Salus, A History of the Diocese of Auckland 1848 – 1980, Catholic Publication Centre, Auckland 1982.

External links
 Archbishop Walter Herman Jacobus Steins SJ, Catholic Hierarchy website (Retrieved 12 February 2011)

1810 births
1881 deaths
19th-century Roman Catholic bishops in India
19th-century Dutch Jesuits
People from the Auckland Region
Clergy from Amsterdam
19th-century Roman Catholic bishops in New Zealand
Roman Catholic bishops of Auckland
New Zealand Roman Catholic archbishops